The 2022 Democratic Action Party National Congress was a central executive committee (CEC) electing congress that was held on 20 March 2022, at the IDCC Ideal Convention Centre in Shah Alam, Selangor. At the congress, delegates of the Malaysian Democratic Action Party (DAP) formally chose former transport minister Anthony Loke Siew Fook and former finance minister Lim Guan Eng as the party's secretary-general and national chairman, respectively, for the term 2021–2024.

Originally scheduled to be held 20 December 2020, simultaneously at Shah Alam, Kota Kinabalu, and Kuching, the congress was twice postponed, first to 20 June 2021, then again to 20 March 2022, due to the ongoing coronavirus pandemic in Malaysia.

Background
The congress was the 17th DAP National Congress. There was heightened public attention to this congress edition as it will see the DAP elect a new secretary-general with the outgoing Lim Guan Eng having served the maximum three terms provided by the party constitution.

Selection of delegates
The DAP's constitution provides for every party branch with at least 25 members to send 2 delegates as their representative. An additional delegate is allowed for branches with membership exceeding 50 and for branches exceeding 100 members, an incremental addition is allowed for every additional 100 paid up members. All of DAP's elected representatives, Members of Parliament (MPs) and Members of the Legislative Assembly (MLAs), alongside other incumbent CEC members are also entitled to attend the congress as delegates. Clause VIII Section 14 allows every delegate to vote for 30 members each to fill the CEC for the upcoming term.

At present, the northwestern states of Penang and Perak consists of the most branches and members, and thus, sends the highest number of delegates.

Logistics

Delay
The congress was originally scheduled to be held 20 December 2020.

On 21 January 2022, it was announced that, due to the COVID-19 pandemic, the congress would again be delayed to 20 March 2022. Then-national organising secretary Anthony Loke announced that this decision was made by the party CEC in line with the advice given by Malaysia's Registrar of Societies (RoS) that the party should hold its triennial congress before 31 March 2022.

Health protocols
Due to the ongoing COVID-19 pandemic, a number of protocols have been put in place.

Participants at IDCC Ideal Convention Centre were required to wear personal protective equipment, undergo daily COVID-19 testing, and follow National Security Council (NSC) guidelines, and health ministry (MOH) standard operating procedures (SOPs).

Congress leadership

Officers
Former Tanjong Batu MLA Chiew Chiu Sing served as the chair of the congress. The deputy chairs of the congress were Nilai MLA Arul Kumar Jambunathan and Seri Delima MLA Syerleena Abdul Rashid.

The congress' returning officer was John Lau Tiang Hua.

Nominating and voting

Central Executive Committee voting

Vote
The table below reflects the delegate votes. Voting results were audited and confirmed by Grant Thornton Malaysia PLT. A total of 93 candidates vied for 30 positions in the CEC.

Clause VIII Section 16 of the DAP's constitution state that a thirty percent quota (30%) of the CEC is reserved for female members translating to at least nine members.

Leadership

Notable speeches

Tan Kok Wai

Tan Kok Wai, as incumbent national chairman of the DAP, delivered his speech first to open the congress as per Clause IX Section 3 of the party constitution.

Tan's speech was focused on both the importance of a mature political culture whilst championing women's rights and anti-corruption. He discussed how the party is empowering women and standing by one of its core principle of equal rights for all races. He touted the DAP's stance on not cooperating with the "perasuah, pengkhianat, penyangak, dan juga katak politik" (corrupt, traitors, rogues, and also "political frogs").

Tan also recounted the personal disappointment of the collapse of the elected government in the aftermath of the 2020 Malaysian political crisis in the hands of the "rejim yang korup" (corrupt regime) who have since shown a lack of capability in administering the nation.

Lim Guan Eng

Lim Guan Eng, the fifth and outgoing secretary-general of the DAP, delivered his speech following the conclusion of Tan's speech.

Lim's speech was focused on secularism and equal rights for all citizens. He discussed how extremism and corruption even during the ongoing COVID-19 pandemic had impacted the economy and led to "various threats". He touted the DAP's success, under his stewardship, in transforming Penang into a leading state in Malaysia within ten years and the regret that they were not accorded the same luxury to do the same for the country as a whole.

Lim also recounted the DAP's past resilience from when he first took office as party secretary-general in September 2004 in its dream to create a better country for all Malaysians in the face of multiple recent state election defeats.

Lim Kit Siang

Lim Kit Siang, the senior member of the DAP, was given an opportunity to give a speech after his son, Guan Eng, announced the elder Lim's retirement from active politics after fifty-six years. In that span, Lim was party secretary-general for thirty years and subsequently became the longest-serving Malaysian Parliamentary Opposition Leader during part of his eleven terms as MP.

Lim's speech was focused on the party's struggle and mission. He urged the party members to continue fighting in line with the party's vision and hope for the country.

Aftermath
Following Lim Kit Siang's decision to retire from active politics, he was given the figurehead position as party mentor whilst outgoing national chairman Tan Kok Wai was named advisor. Rais Yatim, 18th President of the Dewan Negara, remarked that the government should pay tribute to Lim having served over half a century in the nation's political arena.

After news broke that both Lim and Anwar Ibrahim, who was in attendance as People's Justice Party (PKR) president, tested positive for COVID-19, convicted former prime minister Najib Razak remarked on his personal Facebook page why Lim was not fined for hugging attendees. This triggered a response by health minister Khairy Jamaluddin, also on Facebook, that Lim has indeed been issued a 1,000 compound but also questioned as to why Najib himself has yet to pay an outstanding four fines himself and that his officers has refused to accept them.

In the aftermath of the vote, Damansara MP and former corporate man Tony Pua Kiam Wee, who was a key figure in exposing the 1MDB scandal and also pro bono political secretary to Lim Guan Eng during his tenure as finance minister, expressed his surprise in not retaining a position in the CEC despite the number of positions being increased from twenty to thirty. Newly-minted secretary-general Loke seemingly reassured Pua the following day, calling the latter a "very important asset" to the party.

On 23 March 2022, Dr. Boo Cheng Hau, former chairman of the DAP's Johor chapter, called for Lim to step down as party chairman until all of Lim's corruption cases have been resolved in court. Chow Kon Yeow, DAP national vice-chairman and Lim's successor as Penang chief minister, responded on 26 March 2022 that the party will not make any changes to Lim's position until the court has delivered its verdict on the latter's outstanding cases.

See also
Impact of the COVID-19 pandemic on politics

Notes

References

2022 conferences
2022 in Malaysia
2022 in Malaysian politics
2020s in Malaysia
2020s in Malaysian politics
Democratic Action Party
Impact of the COVID-19 pandemic on politics
Events affected by the COVID-19 pandemic